Paro is a town and seat of Paro District, in the Paro Valley of Bhutan. It is a historic town with many sacred sites and historical buildings scattered throughout the area. It is also home to Paro International Airport, Bhutan's sole international airport. Paro International Airport is served by Drukair.

Architecture

The main street has many examples of traditionally decorated buildings.

The Dungtse Lhakhang (a 15th-century temple) and the Ugyen Perli Palace are near the new bridge. Members of royal family lodge in the palace when in Paro. Nearby is the old bridge and the Rinpung Dzong. Notable hotels include the Olathang Hotel built in an ornate style.

About  outside Paro is the famous Paro Taktsang (Tiger's Nest) Buddhist monastery and hermitage. Some Bhutanese believe that Padmasambhava (Guru Rinpoche) flew on the back of a tigress to this location from Tibet. The trek to Tiger's Nest monastery takes about three hours one way. A scenic view of the town of Paro can be seen from the Tiger's Nest. A  road passes up the valley to the ruins of another fortress-monastery, Drukyel Dzong, which was partly destroyed by fire in 1951.

Paro is home to Bhutan's tallest building, the Ta-Dzhong, which is 22 meters (72 feet) high, and has 6 floors. It was completed in 1649.

Airport

Paro Airport has been described as "the most difficult commercial airport in the world", The airport has only one runway. Airplanes on approach pass by 5,500m Himalayan mountain peaks, and the 1,980m runway length presents a double challenge, due to the low air density. As a result, only a handful of airline pilots (8 as of December 2014) are certified to operate commercial aeroplanes there. About 30,000 persons arrive at the airport each year.

Climate
Wangdue Phodrang features a dry-winter subtropical highland climate (Köppen Cwb).

Gallery

See also

 Geography of Bhutan
 Transport in Bhutan

References

External links

Paro City Travel Guide from North Bengal Tourism
Places to see in Paro

Populated places in Bhutan